Terry Harrison may refer to:
Terry Harrison (ice hockey), Dutch-Canadian ice hockey player
Terry Harrison (industrialist), industrialist from the northeast of England
Terry Harrison (Prisoner), fictional character in Australian TV series Prisoner

See also
Teri Harrison (born 1981), American model and actress